New Jersey's 7th Legislative District is one of 40 in the New Jersey Legislature, covering the Burlington County municipalities of Beverly City, Bordentown City, Bordentown Township, Burlington City, Burlington Township, Cinnaminson Township, Delanco Township, Delran Township, Edgewater Park Township, Fieldsboro Borough, Florence Township, Moorestown Township, Mount Laurel Township, Palmyra Borough, Riverside Township, Riverton Borough and Willingboro Township as of the 2011 apportionment.

Demographic characteristics
As of the 2020 United States census, the district had a population of 230,129, of whom 181,640 (78.9%) were of voting age. The racial makeup of the district was 135,209 (58.8%) White, 51,819 (22.5%) African American, 583 (0.3%) Native American, 14,639 (6.4%) Asian, 109 (0.0%) Pacific Islander, 8,935 (3.9%) from some other race, and 18,835 (8.2%) from two or more races. Hispanic or Latino of any race were 19,637 (8.5%) of the population.

The district had 179,511 registered voters as of December 1, 2021, of whom 58,079 (32.4%) were registered as unaffiliated, 80,714 (45.0%) were registered as Democrats, 38,637 (21.5%) were registered as Republicans, and 2,081 (1.2%) were registered to other parties.

As of the 2001 apportionment, the district includes communities in Burlington and Camden counties along the Delaware River. The district had a larger-than-average African-American community, and has low numbers of college graduates, foreign-born individuals and Hispanics. Property values per person were low and tax rates were comparatively high across the district.

Political representation
For the 2022–2023 session, the district is represented in the State Senate by Troy Singleton (D, Palmyra) and in the General Assembly by Herb Conaway (D, Moorestown) and Carol A. Murphy (D, Mount Laurel).

The legislative district is almost entirely located within New Jersey's 3rd congressional district, with the exception of Palmyra, which is in the 1st District.

1965–1973
In the interim period between the 1964 Supreme Court decision Reynolds v. Sims which required the creation of state legislature districts to be made as equal in population as possible and the 1973 creation of the 40-district map, the 7th District consisted of all of Middlesex County. Two senators were elected at-large from the district in the 1965 election, and for the next two elections, three senators were elected. The Senate district was split into three districts for electing members of the Assembly for the 1967, 1969, and 1971 elections; each district elected two members to the Assembly. In addition, the 1971 also included an additional member of the Assembly sent to Trenton elected by the county at-large.

The members elected to the Senate from this district are as follows:

The members elected to the Assembly from each district are as follows:

District composition since 1973
Upon the creation of the 40-district legislative map in 1973, the 7th District started out similar to how it looked throughout its modern history, encompassing the north-central Burlington County townships of Mount Laurel and Lumberton, wrapping around the west and north side of Mount Holly to Springfield Township and Wrightstown. For the 1981 redistricting, the district became more narrow only including municipalities along the Delaware between Pennsauken in Camden County to Burlington Township (also including Maple Shade, Willingboro, and Westampton townships). Thomas P. Foy was named in November 1990 to fill a vacancy in the Senate left by Catherine A. Costa who left office to become Director of the New Jersey Division of Alcoholic Beverage Control. In a party convention in January 1991, Jack Casey was chosen to fill the remaining portion of Foy's term in the General Assembly.

In the 1991 redistricting, the only change made to the district's boundary was the addition of Mount Holly. The district had been voting solidly Democratic until the anti-tax vote in 1991 brought in Republicans Bradford S. Smith in the Senate, who unseated Democratic incumbent Thomas P. Foy. In the Assembly race that year, Priscilla B. Anderson and José F. Sosa won the seats held by Jack Casey and Barbara Kalik. In the 1993 elections, the Republicans held on to their majorities in both houses of the legislature, but Democrats were able to retake the seats in the 7th District, with Jack Casey winning in the Senate and Steven M. Petrillo and George E. Williams in the Assembly. Williams would later switch parties in June 1995, after being denied support from local party leaders for re-nomination. In the 1995 general election, Diane Allen and Republican running mate Carmine DeSopo were elected, defeating Democratic incumbent Steven M. Petrillo and Williams's replacement on the ticket, newcomer Joseph P. Dugan. The $1.1 million spent in the 1995 Assembly race made it the first in New Jersey to cross the $1 million spending mark, as reported in the results of a study conducted by the Center for the Analysis of Public Issues of Princeton that analyzed campaign finance reports from candidates for all 80 Assembly seats.

In the 1997 elections, Republican Diane Allen ran for and won the Senate seat. Democrats Herb Conaway and Jack Conners were the winners in the 1997 Assembly race. After eight months in office, the courts threw out the results of the 1997 election due to problems with a voting machine that affected the results for the second seat. Conners was ordered to leave office in September 1998 and have his seat declared vacant. As Republicans were the last winners of the Assembly seat, the Burlington County Republican Committee was entitled to choose a person to fill the vacant seat. Republican Ken Faulkner, the highest Republican vote-getter in the 1997 election was chosen and seated until a special election could be held. In a November 1998 special election, Conners defeated  Faulkner and was sworn into office for a second time that year. Conaway and Connors would both be re-elected in 1999.

In the 2001 reapportionment, Camden County's Merchantville and Burlington's Florence Township were added to the 7th District. Allen, Conaway, and Connors continued to win re-election through this decade's elections. As part of the 2011 reapportionment, municipalities that had been in the district since the 2001 apportionment were removed including Maple Shade, Merchantville, and Pennsauken (moved to District 6) and Mount Holly and Westampton townships (moved to District 8). Added to the district starting in 2011 were Fieldsboro and the city and township of Bordentown (added from District 30) and Moorestown and Mount Laurel (added from District 8). On March 29, 2011, Conners announced that due to redistricting, he would not seek another term to the Assembly in 2011. He announced his resignation on August 26, 2011, effective immediately to accept a position with Camden County as its director of veterans' affairs. Troy Singleton was selected by the Burlington and Camden County Democratic committees to fill the vacant seat in September 2011. Singleton won in the November general election and was sworn in on November 21, 2011, to finish the remainder of Conners' term, and was sworn into his first full term on January 10, 2012.

Allen declined to run for another term in 2017 due to health concerns, ending twenty years of service in the Senate. Singleton and Conaway both contemplated runs for the open Senate seat, with Singleton declaring his candidacy and Conaway later deciding to run for re-election. In November, Singleton won in a landslide, turning the Senate seat Democratic, with Conaway getting re-elected and Carol A. Murphy winning Singleton's Assembly seat.

Election history

Election results, 1973–present

Senate

General Assembly

Election results, 1965–1973

Senate

General Assembly

District 7A

District 7B

District 7C

District 7 At-large

References

Burlington County, New Jersey
07